This is a list of live action theatrical, television, or direct-to-video/DVD films that were based on cartoons and comics:

A

The Addams Family (1991)
Addams Family Values (1993)
Addams Family Reunion (1998)
Adventures of Captain Marvel (1941)
The Adventures of Rocky and Bullwinkle (2000)
Æon Flux (2005)
Aladdin (2019)
Alice in Wonderland (2010)
Alice Through the Looking Glass (2016)
All Dogs Go to Heaven (TBA)
Alita: Battle Angel (2019)
Alvin and the Chipmunks film series
The Amazing Spider-Man (2012)
The Amazing Spider-Man 2 (2014)
American Splendor (2003)
An American Tail (TBA)
Annie (1982)
Annie (1999)
Animal Farm (1999)
Annie (2014)   
Arthur (TBA)
Arcee (TBA)
Ant-Man (2015)
Ant-Man and the Wasp (2018)
Ant-Man and the Wasp: Quantumania (2023)
Aquaman (2018)
Aquaman and the Lost Kingdom (2023)
Archie: To Riverdale and Back Again (1990)
Untitled Illumination/Acivision/Blizzard project film 
The Aristocats (TBA)
Armor Wars (TBA)
Assassination Classroom (2015)
Assassination Classroom: Graduation (2016)
Asterix film series
Atom Man vs. Superman (1950)
Atomic Blonde (2017)
Attack on Titan (2015)
Asura Girl: Blood-C Another Story (2017)
The Avengers (2012) 
Avengers: Age of Ultron (2015)
Avengers: Endgame (2019)
Avengers: Infinity War (2018)
Avengers: The Kang Dynasty (2025)
Avengers: Secret Wars (2026)

B

Baby Huey's Great Easter Adventure (1999)
Batman (1943)
Batman (1966) 
Batman (1989)
The Batman (2022) 
The Batman – Part II (2025) 
Batman & Robin (1949)
Batman & Robin (1997) 
Batman Begins (2005)
Batman Forever (1995)
Batman Returns  (1992) 
Batman v Superman: Dawn of Justice (2016)
Babar (TBA)
Barbie (2023)
Barnyard (TBA)
Bubblegum (TBA)
Billy Hatcher and the Giant Egg (TBA)
Bleach: The Movie (TBA)
Blue’s Big City Adventure (2022)
Bambi (TBA)
Beauty and the Beast (2017)
Ben 10: Race Against Time (2007)
Ben 10: Alien Swarm (2009)
Birds of Prey (2020)
Blackhawk (1952)
The Black Cauldron (TBA)
Black Canary (TBA)
Black Adam (2022)
Blue Beetle (2023)
Black Butler (2014)
Black Panther (2018)
Black Panther: Wakanda Forever (2022)
Black Widow (2021)
Blade (1998)
Blade II (2002)
Blade: Trinity (2004)
Blade (2024)
Bleach (2018)
Blondie film series
Bloodshot (2020)
The Brave Little Toaster (TBA)
Boris and Natasha: The Movie (1992)
Buck Rogers (1939)
Buck Rogers in the 25th Century (1979)
Bumblebee (2018)

C

Captain America (1944)
Captain America (1979)
Captain America (1990)
Captain America II: Death Too Soon (1979)
Captain America: The First Avenger (2011)
Captain America: The Winter Soldier (2014)
Captain America: Civil War (2016)
Captain America New World Order (2024)
Captain Marvel (2019)
Casper (1995)
Casper: A Spirited Beginning (1997)
Casper Meets Wendy (1998)
Captain Planet (TBA)
Casshern (2004)
Catwoman (2004)
Charlotte's Web (2006)
Christopher Robin (2018)
Chip 'n Dale: Rescue Rangers (2022)
The Casagrandes (TBA)
Cinderella (2015)
Clifford The Big Red Dog (2021)
Clifford The Big Red Dog 2 (TBA)
Cloudy with a Chance of Meatballs (TBA)
Congo Bill (1948) 
Coyote vs. Acme (2023)
Constantine (2005)
The Crow film series
Cruella (2021)
Curious George (TBA)

D
Daphne & Velma (2018)
Daredevil (2003)
Dariya Dil (1988)
The Dark Knight (2008) 
The Dark Knight Rises (2012)
Dark Phoenix (2019) 
Dasepo Naughty Girls (2006)
Deadpool (2016)
Deadpool 2 (2018)
Deadpool 3 (2024)
Death Note (2006)
Death Note 2: The Last Name (2006)
Death Note: Light Up the New World (2016)
Death Note (2017)
The Death of the Incredible Hulk (1990) 
Dennis the Menace (1987) 
Dennis the Menace (1993)
Dennis the Menace Strikes Again
A Dennis the Menace Christmas
Dungeons & Dragons film series 
Dragon Tales The Movie (2028) 
Demon Slayer: Kimetsu no Yaiba The Movie (TBA) 
Untitled Digimon Live-Action project film (TBA) 
3 Dev Adam (1973)
Diabolik (1974)  
Dick Tracy (1937)
Dick Tracy vs. Crime, Inc. (1941)
Dick Tracy (1945)
Dick Tracy (1990)
Dondi (1961)
Dr. Strange (TV, 1978)
Doctor Strange (2016)
Doctor Strange in the Multiverse of Madness (2022)
Dora and the Lost City of Gold (2019)
Dragonball: Evolution (2009)
Dredd (2012)
Dudley Do-Right (1999)
Dumbo (2019)

E

Elektra (2005)
Eternals (2021)
El Muerto (2024)
Ecco the Dolphin (TBA)
The Evangelion (TBA)

F

The Fairly OddParents film series
Fantastic Four film series
Fat Albert (2004)
Fatty Finn (1980)
Fireman Sam in Action (1996)
The Flash (2023)
Flash Gordon (1936)
Flash Gordon (1980)
Flash Gordon's Trip to Mars (1938)
Flash Gordon Conquers the Universe (1940)
The Flintstones (1994) 
The Flintstones in Viva Rock Vegas (2000)
The Fox and the Hound (TBA)
Fritz the Cat (TBA)
Fullmetal Alchemist (2017)

G

Garfield (2004) 
Garfield: A Tail of Two Kitties (2006)
Gatchaman (2013) 
Generation X (TV, 1996)
George of the Jungle (1997) 
George of the Jungle 2 (direct-to-video, 2003)
The Great Mouse Detective (TBA)
Green Lantern (2011)
Green Lantern Corps (TBA)
Ghost in the Shell (2017) 
Ghost Rider (2007)
Ghost Rider: Spirit of Vengeance (2012)
Ghost World (2001)
Geronimo Stilton
Gundam (TBA)
G.I. Joe film series
Gintama (2017)
Guardians of the Galaxy (2014)
Guardians of the Galaxy Vol. 2 (2017)
Guardians of the Galaxy Vol. 3 (2023)

H
Halloween with the New Addams Family (1977)
Hellboy (2004)
Hellboy (2019)
Hellboy 2: The Golden Army (2008)
Harold and the Purple Crayon (2023)
Higglytown Heroes (TBA) 
Hercules (TBA)
The Hunchback of Notre Dame (2024)
How the Grinch Stole Christmas (2000)
Howard the Duck (1986)
Hulk (2003)
How to Train Your Dragon (2025)

I

Ice Age film series 
The Incredible Hulk (2008)
The Incredible Hulk Returns (TV, 1988) 
Initial D (2005)
Iron Man (2008)
Iron Man 2 (2010)
Iron Man 3 (2013)
The Iron Giant (TBA)
Inspector Gadget (1999) 
Inspector Gadget 2 (direct-to-video, 2003)
Inspector Gadget Reboot (TBA)

J

Jackpot (TBA)
James and the Giant Peach (TBA)
Jem and the Holograms (2015)
Joker (2019)
Jonah Hex (2010)
Josie and the Pussycats (2001)
Jet Set Radio (TBA)
Judge Dredd (1995)
The Jungle Book (2016)
The Jungle Book 2 (TBA)
Justice League (2017)
Zack Snyder's Justice League (2021) 
Justice League of America (1997)

K

Kingsman film series 
Kick-Ass (2010)
Kick-Ass 2 (2013) 
Kim Possible (2019)
The Kitchen (2019)
Kite (2014)
Kraven the Hunter (2023)

L

L: Change the World (2008)
The Last Airbender (2010)
Lady and the Tramp (2019)
The League of Extraordinary Gentlemen (2003)
Li'l Abner (1940) 
Li'l Abner (1959)
Little Orphan Annie (1932)
Little Orphan Annie (1938)
Lilo & Stitch (2024)
Little Bear (TBA)
Littlest Pet Shop (TBA)
The Little Mermaid (2023)
Lyle, Lyle, Crocodile (2022)
Lyle Lyle Crocodile 2 (TBA)
The Lion King (2019)
Logan (2017)
A Loud House Christmas (2021)
The Loud House (movie) (TBA)
Looney Tunes: Back in Action (2003)

M
Madeline (1998)
Maleficent (2014)
Maleficent: Mistress of Evil (2019)
Maleficent 3 (2024)
Man of Steel (2013) 
Man-Thing (2005)
Marmaduke (2010)
The Marvels (2023)
Madame Web (2024)
Mickey! (2023)
Monster High: The Movie (2022)
The Magic School Bus (TBA)
The Mask (1994)
Mufasa: The Lion King (2024)
Masters of the Universe Reboot(2024)
Mighty Mouse (TBA)
Millsberry (TBA)
Masters of the Universe (1987)
Max Steel (2016)
Men in Black film series
Morbius (2022)
Mr. Magoo (1997)
Mulan (2020)
Mutt and Jeff series (1911-1913)

N
The New Mutants (2020)
Nick Fury: Agent of S.H.I.E.L.D. (1998)
Nicky Larson et le Parfum de Cupidon (2019)
No Flying In The House (TBA)
The Nightmare Before Christmas (TBA)
Nightwatch (TBA)

O
Office Space (1999)
Old Bill and Son (1941)
Once Upon A Deadpool (2018)
Oliver & Company (TBA)

P

Painkiller Jane (2005)
Peter Pan & Wendy (2023)
The Phantom (1943)
The Phantom (1996)
Paddington (2015)
Paddington 2 (2018)
Paddington in Peru (TBA)
Pingu (TBA)
Pinocchio (2022)
Pocahontas (TBA)
Puff, the Magic Dragon (TBA)
Pac-Man (TBA)
Persona 5: The Movie (TBA)
Pokémon: Detective Pikachu (2019)
Popeye (1980)
The Punisher (1989)
The Punisher (2004)
Punisher: War Zone (2008)

Q
Quest for Camelot

R

RED (2010) 
Red 2 (2013)
The Return of Swamp Thing (1989)
Riki-Oh: The Story of Ricky (1991)
Rabbids (TBA)
The Rescuers (TBA)
The Rocketeer (1991)
The Rugrats Movie (TBA)
Rugrats: All Grown Up (TBA)
Rocko's Modern Life: The Movie (TBA)
Robin Hood (TBA)
Recess (TBA)
Rhino (TBA)

S

Sabrina the Teenage Witch (1996)
Sabrina Goes to Rome (1998)
Sabrina Down Under (1999)
The Sad Sack (1957)
Scooby-Doo film series
Scott Pilgrim vs. the World (2010)
The Secret of NIMH (TBA)
The Shadow (1940)
The Shadow (1994)
Shang-Chi and the Legend of the Ten Rings (2021)
Shang-Chi 2 (2024)
Shazam! (2019)
Shazam! Fury of the Gods (2023)
Sin City (2005)
Sin City: A Dame to Kill For (2014)
Skippy (1931)
Slumberland (2022)
The Smurfs (2011) 
The Smurfs 2 (2013)
Snake Eyes (2021)
Son of the Mask (2005)
Sonic the Hedgehog (2020)
Sonic the Hedgehog 2 (2022)
Sonic the Hedgehog 3 (2024)  
Sonic Riders: The Movie (TBA)  
Super Monkey Ball: The Movie (TBA)  
Samba de Amigo (TBA)  
Super Smash Bros. Film Series 
Space Battleship Yamato (2010)
Space Jam (1996)
Space Jam: A New Legacy (2021) 
Space Invaders (TBA) 
Sparks (2013)
Spawn (1997)
Speed Racer (2008)
Spider-Man (1977)
Spider-Man (1978)
Spider-Man (2002)
Spider-Man 2 (2004)
Spider-Man 3 (2007)
Spider-Man: Homecoming (2017)
Spider-Man: Far From Home (2019)
Spider-Man: No Way Home (2021)
Spider-Man 7 (TBA)
The Spirit (2008)
SpongeBob SquarePants film series
The Sword in the Stone (TBA)
Steel (1997)
Stuart Little (1999)
Stuart Little 2 (2002)
Stuart Little (TBA)
The Swan Princess film series 
Snow White (2024)
The Suicide Squad (2021)
Suicide Squad (2016)
Superman (1948)
Superman (1978)
Superman (1980)
Superman II (1980)
Superman III (1983)
Superman IV: The Quest for Peace (1987)
Superman Returns (2006)
Superman and the Mole Men (1951)
Superman: Legacy (2025)
Supergirl (1984)
Swamp Thing (1982)

T

Teenage Mutant Ninja Turtles (1990)
Teenage Mutant Ninja Turtles (2014)
Teenage Mutant Ninja Turtles II: The Secret of the Ooze (1991)
Teenage Mutant Ninja Turtles III (1993)
Teenage Mutant Ninja Turtles: Out of the Shadows (2016)
Untitled Teenage Mutant Ninja Turtles New Live-Action Film (TBA)
TUFF Puppy: The Movie (TBA)
Thor (2011) 
Thor: The Dark World (2013)
Thor: Ragnarok (2017)
Thor: Love and Thunder (2022)
Thunderbolts (2024)
Tarzan (TBA)
Tink (TBA)
Timecop (1994)
Timecop 2: The Berlin Decision (2003)
Tintin and the Golden Fleece (1961) 
Tintin and the Blue Oranges (1964)
Teen Titans (TBA)
Tom and Jerry (2021)
Toy Story (TBA)
Talking Tom & Friends film series 
Transformers film series 
Thomas & Friends: The Movie (TBA)
The Trial of the Incredible Hulk (1989)

U

Underdog (2007)
Untitled Universal Destinations & Experiences animated project film  (TBA)

V

V for Vendetta (2005)
Valerian and the City of a Thousand Planets (2017)
Venom (2018)
Venom: Let There Be Carnage (2021)
Venom 3 (2024)
Vicky the Viking (2009)
Vicky and the Treasure of the Gods (2011)

W

Watchmen (2009)
Werewolf by Night (2022)
Whiteout (2009)
The Wolverine (2013)
Wonder Woman (1974)
Wonder Woman (2017)
Wonder Woman 1984 (2020)
The Wild Thornberry (TBA)
Woody Woodpecker (2017)
Wonka (2023)

X

X-Men film series

Y

Yatterman (2009)
Yogi Bear (2010)
Yo-Kai Watch: Soratobu Kujira to Double no Sekai no Daiboken da Nyan! (2016)

Z
Zatanna (TBA)

0-9

101 Dalmatians (1996)
102 Dalmatians (2000)

References

 
 
